Esser Hill is a peak,  high, standing between the divergent flow of Priddy Glacier and Blackwelder Glacier,  southwest of Chambers Hill, on the Scott Coast of Victoria Land. It was named in 1992 by the Advisory Committee on Antarctic Names after Alan C. Esser of Holmes and Narver, Inc., who served as Project Manager of Antarctic Support Activities, 1976–80, and was responsible for contractor operations at McMurdo Station, South Pole Station and Siple Station, as well as field activities in support of the U.S. Antarctic Program.

References 

Mountains of Victoria Land
Scott Coast